The Alexandre Latiolais House is a historic house located at 900 East Butcher Switch Road in Lafayette, Louisiana.

The -story building is the result of two periods of construction. The first one, dated c.1790, produced a complete house of four rooms, with a front and rear gallery and an attic, in a typical French Creole layout. About 1827, the building was enlarged in a more modern Federal style with the addition of two rooms to the northern side, the continuation of gallery and the updating of all the woodworks.

The building was listed on the National Register of Historic Places on May 9, 1985.

See also
 National Register of Historic Places listings in Lafayette Parish, Louisiana

References

Houses on the National Register of Historic Places in Louisiana
Creole architecture in Louisiana
Federal architecture in Louisiana
Houses completed in 1790
Lafayette Parish, Louisiana
National Register of Historic Places in Lafayette Parish, Louisiana